Marchington railway station was a railway station in Marchington, Staffordshire which opened in 1854 and closed in 1958. It was on the Crewe to Derby Line.

History
The station was opened by the North Staffordshire Railway.  The opening date is unsure but the first record of the station in Bradshaw's is in February 1854. From 1862 it was also served by Great Northern Railway services on the route between Stafford and Grantham.

The station was closed by the British Transport Commission in 1958.

The platforms are still in place today, although overgrown, and the station master's cottage is now a private residence. Trains on the Crewe to Derby Line still pass through the station.

References

Further reading

Disused railway stations in Staffordshire
Railway stations in Great Britain opened in 1854
Railway stations in Great Britain closed in 1958
Former North Staffordshire Railway stations
railway station